These are the results of the girls' singles badminton event at the 2010 Summer Youth Olympics. The 32 qualified athletes were split into 8 groups, with four players each. In their groups, they play a one-way round-robin and the first of each group qualifies to the quarterfinals, where they play a knock-out stage until the medal matches.

Badminton was staged at the Singapore Indoor Stadium.

Medalists

Group play

Results

Group A

Group B

Group C

Group D

Group E

Group F

Group G

Group H

Knockout stage

References
Schedule
Results

Badminton at the 2010 Summer Youth Olympics